The Album of the Soundtrack of the Trailer of the Film of Monty Python and the Holy Grail is the first film soundtrack album by Monty Python, released in 1975. It features selected scenes from Monty Python and the Holy Grail interspersed with a large volume of new studio material, much of which centers on a spoof screening of the film at the Classic Silbury Hill Theatre. Also among the new items is the "Marilyn Monroe" sketch, which Graham Chapman co-wrote with Douglas Adams - the pair having recently collaborated on the fourth series of Monty Python.

The album is billed as the 'Executive Version' as a joke on popular 'special editions"' of albums that contained extra tracks unavailable on earlier versions. Naturally, no other version of this album existed when it was originally released. On the A-side of the original UK vinyl release, the engraved text by George Peckham around the label reads: "AN EXECUTIVE PORKY PRIME CUT", while on the B-side it reads: "THIS IS THE SMALL DETAILED WRITING ON THE RECORD OF THE ALBUM OF THE SOUNDTRACK OF THE TRAILER OF THE FILM OF MONTY PYTHON AND THE HOLY GRAIL - THIS WRITING IS NOT INCLUDED ON THE EXECUTIVE VERSION OF THE ALBUM OF THE SOUNDTRACK OF THE TRAILER OF THE FILM OF MONTY PYTHON AND THE HOLY GRAIL".

The album reached No. 45 in the UK album charts.

A CD reissue in 1997 contains extended versions of two sketches, "Arrival At Castle" and "French Taunter"; this CD reissue also contains "The Bridge of Death". These additions are not available on any other version of the album.

In 2006, a special edition was released containing three bonus tracks, consisting of two demos of unused Neil Innes songs and an audio extract of a documentary from the film's DVD release. This version of the CD does not contain "The Bridge of Death" or the two extended sketches.

Also in 2006, yet another CD reissue was included within Monty Python and the Holy Grail: 'The Extraordinarily Deluxe DVD Edition'. The bonus features disc had instructions on how to play the record; this CD does not contain "The Bridge of Death", the bonus tracks, or the two extended versions.

A limited edition picture disc of the album was released on 29 August 2020, as part of Record Store Day. This added the film's 40th anniversary trailer to the start of the album.

Track listing

Side One
Introduction To The Executive Version
Tour Of The Classic Silbury Hill Theatre
Live Broadcast From London: Premiere Of The Film
Narration From The Silbury Hill Gentlemen's Room 
Arrival At Castle (extended version on 1997 CD)
Bring Out Your Dead
Constitutional Peasants
Witch Burning
Logician
Camelot Song
The Quest For The Holy Grail
Live From The Parking Lot At The Silbury Hill Theatre
French Taunter (extended version on 1997 CD)
Bomb Scare

Side Two
This Is Side Two!
Executive Version Announcement - Apology
The Story So Far
Brave Sir Robin
The Knights Who Say Ni!
Marilyn Monroe
Swamp Castle
Tim the Enchanter
Drama Critique
Holy Hand Grenade of Antioch
The Bridge of Death (1997 CD version only)
Executive Version Addendum
French Taunter - Part 2
Last Word

Bonus Tracks on the 2006 special edition
Arthur's Song
Documentary - Terry Jones And Michael Palin
Run Away Song

Music credits
The following is the list of musical works included on the album. They comprise a mixture of De Wolfe library music, self-penned Python songs and specially composed music by Neil Innes.

 Jeunesse (A. Mawer)
 Honours List (K. Papworth)
 Big Country (K. Papworth)
 Homeward Bound (T. Trombey)
 God Choir (Neil Innes)
 Fanfare (Neil Innes)
 Camelot Song (Graham Chapman, John Cleese & Neil Innes)
 Sunrise Music (Neil Innes)
 Magic Finger (K. Papworth)
 Sir Robin's Song (Eric Idle & Neil Innes)
 In The Shadows (No.3) (Paul Ferris)
 Desperate Moment (K. Essex)
 Knights Of Ni (Neil Innes)
 Circle Of Danger (B. Holmes)
 Love Theme (P. Knight)
 Magenta (R. Webb)
 Starlet In The Starlight (K. Essex)
 Monks Chant (Neil Innes)
 The Promised Land (S. Black)

References 

Monty Python soundtracks
Monty Python and the Holy Grail
1975 soundtrack albums
Arista Records soundtracks
Charisma Records soundtracks